The Soviet Women's Handball Championship (Чемпионат СССР по гандболу среди женщин) was the premier women's handball championship in the Soviet Union. Founded in 1962, it last took place in 1992 following the state's collapse.

Luch Moscow (previously Trud) and Žalgiris Kaunas were early powerhouses of the championship. Spartak Kiev subsequently dominated the championship for two decades, with twenty titles in a row between 1969 and 1988. The four last editions were won by Kuban Krasnodar and Rostselmash. Avtomobilist Baku was the championship's runner-up a record 9 times, but wasn't able to win it.  

The Soviet Championship was arguably one of the top women's handball competitions in the world. Spartak Kiev extended its dominance to the European Cup with 13 titles, and Avtomobilist Baku, Eglė Vilnius, Kuban Krasnodar, Luch Moscow, Rostselmash and Žalgiris Kaunas also won international competitions.

List of champions

 1962:  Trud Moscow
 1963:  Trud Moscow
 1964:  Trud Moscow
 1965:  Trud Moscow
 1966:  Žalgiris Kaunas
 1967:  Žalgiris Kaunas
 1968:  Luch Moscow
 1969:  Spartak Kiev
 1970:  Spartak Kiev
 1971:  Spartak Kiev
 1972:  Spartak Kiev

 1973:  Spartak Kiev
 1974:  Spartak Kiev
 1975:  Spartak Kiev
 1976:  Spartak Kiev
 1977:  Spartak Kiev
 1978:  Spartak Kiev
 1979:  Spartak Kiev
 1980:  Spartak Kiev
 1981:  Spartak Kiev
 1982:  Spartak Kiev
 1983:  Spartak Kiev

 1984:  Spartak Kiev
 1985:  Spartak Kiev
 1986:  Spartak Kiev
 1987:  Spartak Kiev
 1988:  Spartak Kiev
 1989:  Kuban Krasnodar
 1990:  Rostselmash
 1991:  Rostselmash
 1992:  Kuban Krasnodar

References

 

Soviet
Handball
Handball in the Soviet Union
Women's handball in the Soviet Union